The University of Eastern Piedmont "Amedeo Avogadro" (shortened to UNIPMN or UPO) is a university located in Alessandria, Novara and Vercelli, in the region of Piedmont, Italy. It was founded in 1998 and is organized in seven faculties, which before then were part of the University of Turin.

Organization
These are the seven faculties in which the university is divided into:

 Economics
 Law
 Letters and Philosophy
 Mathematics, Physics and Natural Sciences
 Medicine and Surgery
 Pharmacy
 Political Sciences.

The university also includes an inter-department research centre, the CRIMEDIM (Research Center in Disaster and Emergency Medicine).

See also 
 List of Italian universities
 Amedeo Avogadro

External links
 del Piemonte Orientale Website
 European Master in Disaster Medicine

University of Eastern Piedmont
Educational institutions established in 1998
1998 establishments in Italy
Vercelli